Letohrádek Hvězda (translating into English as "Star Villa" or "Star Summer Palace") is a Renaissance villa situated in a game reserve of the same name (Obora Hvězda) in Liboc, Prague 6, 7 kilometres west of Prague city centre.

The surrounding game reserve was founded in 1530 by King Ferdinand I. Twenty-five years later he commissioned his younger son Ferdinand II, Archduke of Austria, to build the villa. The foundations were laid on 27 June 1555 by the Archduke alone, and construction of the villa was completed three years later. The villa is shaped as a six-pointed star, from which it and the game reserve acquire their shared name.

In 1962 the villa was listed as a national cultural monument, which it remains today. An exhibition relating to the Battle of White Mountain, which took place nearby, is now on permanent display inside the publicly accessible villa.

External links

 Memorial of National Literature – Hvězda Summer Palace
 Satellite Image of Hvězda
 kudyznudy.cz (in Czech)

Buildings and structures in Prague
Renaissance architecture in the Czech Republic
Tourist attractions in Prague
National Cultural Monuments of the Czech Republic